Lõõla is a village in Türi Parish, Järva County, in central Estonia. As of 2011 Census, the settlement's population was 123.

The largest dairy farm in the Baltic states, is located in Lõõla village. It is owned by Väätsa Agro and accommodates 2,200 milking cows.

References

External links
Lõõla village society 

Villages in Järva County